In mathematics, change of base can mean any of several things:
Changing numeral bases, such as converting from base 2 (binary) to base 10 (decimal). This is known as base conversion.
The logarithmic change-of-base formula, one of the logarithmic identities used frequently in algebra and calculus.
The method for changing between polynomial and normal bases, and similar transformations, for purposes of coding theory and cryptography.
Construction of the fiber product of schemes, in algebraic geometry.

See also
 Change of basis
 Base change (disambiguation)